Bugs Bunny: Lost in Time is a Looney Tunes platform video game released for the PlayStation and Microsoft Windows in 1999. An indirect sequel, Bugs Bunny & Taz: Time Busters, was released for the same platforms in 2000.

Plot 
The game stars Looney Tunes cartoon character Bugs Bunny who finds and activates a time travel machine (mistaking it for a carrot juice dispenser) after taking a wrong turn at Albuquerque, intending to go to Pismo Beach. He ends up in Nowhere, home of a sorcerer named Merlin Munroe. Merlin then informs Bugs that he is lost in time and that he must travel through five different eras of time in order to collect clock symbols and golden carrots that will allow him to return to the present.

Gameplay 
The objective of this game is to collect time clocks to progress through different eras via the time machine. In Nowhere, which acts as a tutorial level, Bugs Bunny will learn the basic moves he needs to use to progress through the game. He can kick, jump, pick up objects, roll, jump into rabbit holes to move underground, tiptoe to avoid alerting other enemies, climb ropes, and use his rabbit ears like propellers to slowly descend to the ground from high places. Bugs can also move some objects to get to certain places. Enemies in the game are mostly simple to beat. Some can be defeated with a kick or a jump, while others may require Bugs to be chased by an enemy until they run out of breath, then they can be kicked in the back. There are also special abilities for Bugs to learn from Merlin much later as he progresses through the game.

While in the time machine, there are five different eras (spanning 21 levels in total) for Bugs Bunny to visit. They are the Stone Age, Pirate Years, The 1930s, Medieval Period, and Dimension X. Each level has clock symbols and golden carrots for Bugs to find in the game. There are also normal carrots for Bugs to pick up, which act as a form of defense similar to rings from Sonic the Hedgehog. Carrots can be collected by finding them scattered in a level or defeating an enemy. If Bugs gets hit, he will lose 3 carrots. He can hold up to 99 carrots. There are some levels that require a full amount of carrots in order to play them. After completing a level, Merlin will appear and the player can decide if they wish to save their progress up to that point. At the end of each era, Bugs must confront and defeat a boss character to unlock the next era.

Development 
Publisher Infogrames acquired the rights to release video games featuring the Looney Tunes characters in early 1998.

In late 2017, beta screenshots of the game surfaced on YouTube, attained from "PlayStation Zone Volume 3". A movie containing beta footage of multiple levels including the Stone Age and Medieval Period was also featured in PlayStation Zone Volume 7.

Reception 

The game was met with very average to mixed reception, as GameRankings gave it a score of 68.33% for the PlayStation version, and 53.75% for the PC version.

References

External links 
 

1999 video games
3D platform games
PlayStation (console) games
Windows games
Video games about time travel
Video games set in the 1930s
Video games set in the Caribbean
Video games set in medieval England
Video games set in Spain
Video games set in the United States
Video games set on fictional planets
Video games set in prehistory
Video games featuring Bugs Bunny
Infogrames games
Behaviour Interactive games
Video games developed in Canada
Warner Bros. video games
Single-player video games